Alden J. Blethen (December 27, 1845 – July 12, 1915) was a teacher and attorney, who was editor-in-chief of the Seattle Daily Times from August 10, 1896 until his death. He was often referred to as Colonel Blethen.

Born in Knox County, Maine, Blethen first became a schoolteacher, then a lawyer.  At age 34 he moved his family to Kansas City, Missouri and purchased part interest in the Kansas City Journal, becoming one of the incorporators of the Kansas City Club.

In 1884 after little success in Kansas, he moved to Minneapolis and became part owner of the Minneapolis Tribune. For the next 12 years, he operated the paper successfully and began to be called "Colonel," an appellation he preferred for the rest of his life.

In 1896 with others, he purchased the Seattle Daily Times, a four-page daily newspaper with a readership of around 4,000, and  succeeded in turning it into a large newspaper, attaining much power and prestige in the Seattle community. At the time of his death, Seattle magazine The Town Crier wrote that "he was an editor whose personality pervaded the medium which he controlled."

After his death in Seattle, the newspaper stayed in the family: Alden J. Blethen (1896–1915); Clarance Brettun Blethen (1915–1941); William Kingsley Blethen (1949–1967); John Alden "Jack" Blethen (1967–1982); Frank A. Blethen (1945–present).  In 1929 Clarance sold 49.5% of the company's voting shares to Knight-Ridder.

Citations

References

External links 
 HistoryLink's essay about Alden J. Blethen

1845 births
1915 deaths
The Seattle Times people
People from Knox County, Maine
Kents Hill School alumni
19th-century American educators
19th-century American lawyers
Newspaper publishers (people)